Clanculus granti is a species of sea snail, a marine gastropod mollusk in the family Trochidae, the top snails.

Description
The height of the shell attains 10 mm. It contains seven whorls. The colour, on the last three whorls, consists of oblique and zigzag brick-red stripes extending from suture to the periphery Between these as well as on the apex and base, the shell is pale cream.

Sculpture: the third, fourth and fifth whorls carry distinct spiral grooves latticed by oblique threads, which do not cross the intervening ridges. On the latter whorls this sculpture gradually fades away, leaving the body whorl smooth and polished. Around the axis on the base run four profound spiral grooves, the outer deepest, separated by smooth, prominent, narrow cords. The narrow umbilicus is bounded by a tuberculate rib, within which it is excavate, and spirally ascends the full height of the shell's interior. The aperture is very oblique and rhomboidal. The outer lip is sharp, bevelled within and carrying a strong deep-seated tubercle. The parietal callus is coarsely wrinkled. The columella spirally ascends the umbilicus, terminating anteriorly in a massive bifid tooth, and higher up supporting a small tubercle.

Distribution
This marine species occurs off the Philippines, Fiji, Tonga and Australia (Queensland)

References

 Wilson, B. 1993. Australian Marine Shells. Prosobranch Gastropods. Kallaroo, Western Australia : Odyssey Publishing Vol. 1 408 pp
 Jansen, P. 1995. A review of the genus Clanculus Montfort, 1810 (Gastropoda: Trochidae) in Australia, with description of a new subspecies and the introduction of a nomen novum. Vita Marina 43(1-2): 39-62

External links
 To Biodiversity Heritage Library (1 publication)
 To World Register of Marine Species
 

granti
Gastropods described in 1907